The Tower of Jewels is a 1919 American silent crime film directed by Tom Terriss and starring Corinne Griffith, Maurice Costello and Estelle Taylor.

Cast
 Corinne Griffith as 	Emily Cottrell
 Webster Campbell as 	Wayne Parrish
 Henry Stephenson as David Parrish
 Maurice Costello as 	Fraser Grimstead
 Charles Halton as Jimmy the Rat
 Estelle Taylor as Adele Warren
 Edward Elkas as Bornheim
 Charles Craig as Drew

References

Bibliography
 Connelly, Robert B. The Silents: Silent Feature Films, 1910-36, Volume 40, Issue 2. December Press, 1998.

External links
 

1919 films
1919 drama films
American silent feature films
American black-and-white films
Films directed by Tom Terriss
Vitagraph Studios films
1910s English-language films
1910s American films
Silent American drama films